A Blueprint of the World is the debut album by the neo-progressive rock band Enchant.

Track listing 
 "The Thirst" (Ott) – 6:16
 "Catharsis" (Benignus, Cline, Craddick) – 5:53
 "Oasis" (Craddick, Ott) – 8:11
 "Acquaintance" (Ott) – 6:31
 "Mae Dae" (Benignus, Ott) – 3:24
 "At Death's Door" (Cline, Craddick) – 7:16
 "East of Eden" (Benignus, Cline, Craddick, Ott) – 5:50
 "Nighttime Sky" (Craddick, Ott) – 8:57
 "Enchanted" (Craddick, Ott) – 7:17
 "Open Eyes" (Ott) – 7:43

Personnel 
 Paul Craddick – drums
 Ted Leonard – vocals
 Douglas A. Ott – guitar
 Ed Platt – bass guitar
 Mike "Benignus" Geimer – keyboards

Guest musicians 
 Steve Rothery – plays Ebow on track 1, and guitar solo on track 8. He produced five tracks [1, 2, 4, 7, 8] and remixed two [3, 9].

References

External links 

1995 debut albums
Enchant (band) albums